Mariya Aleksandrovna Lugovaya (born July 23, 1987) is a Russian actress and theater star, best known for playing Tasya Lapina in 2008 television series Ginger, and her lead role as Marusya Klimova in the 2017 television series Murka (ru).

Early life
Mariya Lugovaya was born in Leningrad, Russian SFSR, Soviet Union (now Saint Petersburg, Russia).

Her parents worked as teachers of philosophy. From early childhood, Mariya was engaged in ballroom dancing and music, studied at music school.

In 2008 she graduated from the Russian State Institute of Performing Arts, then moved to Moscow. and from 2008, she played at the Alexandrin Theatre.

Acting career
Mariya began to star in the television Favorsky in 2005, but became famous in 2008 as a blind pianist Tasya Lapina from the television series Ginger.

Lugovaya played her lead role as Marusya Klimova in the 2017 television series Murka, which is about the corrupt world of Odessa in the 1920s. In the same year Mariya appeared on the front cover of the Caravan Of Stories Collection Magazine Cover [Russia] (April 2017) 

In 2019, Lugovaya played the character 'Lara'  (Larisa Kuras) in the Netflix TV series  Better than Us, who was attempting to sell the robot Arisa in order to pay for a surgical operation on her life threatening brain tumour.

Personal 
Since January 2018 she has been in a relationship with the actor Sergey Lavygin.

Filmography

References

External links
 

1987 births
Living people
Actresses from Saint Petersburg
21st-century Russian actresses
Russian film actresses
Russian television actresses
Russian stage actresses